Major Wilson's Last Stand is an 1899 British short silent war film based upon the historical accounts of the Shangani Patrol. The film was adapted from Savage South Africa, a stage show depicting scenes from both the First Matabele War and the Second Matabele War which opened at the Empress Theatre, Earls Court, on 8 May 1899. It was shot by Joseph Rosenthal for the Warwick Trading Co. Ltd.

Copies of the film originally sold for £3. It was shown to audiences at the Olympic Theatre in London and at the Refined Concert Company in New Zealand.

Story
The studio's original description is as follows:

Major Wilson and his brave men are seen in laager in order to snatch a brief rest after a long forced march. They are suddenly awakened by the shouts of the savages, who surround them on all sides.  The expected reinforcements alas arrived too late. The Major calls upon his men to show the enemy how a handful of British soldiers can play a losing game as well as a winning one.  He bids them to stand shoulder to shoulder, and fight and die for their Queen. The horses are seen to fall, and from the rampart of dead horses, the heroic band fight to the last round of revolver ammunition. The Major, who is the last to fall, crawls to the top of the head of dead men, savages and horses, and makes every one of the few remaining cartridges find its mark until his life is cut short by the thrust of an assegai in the hands of a savage, who attacks him from behind. Before he falls however, he fires his last bullet into the fleeing carcass of the savage, who drops dead. The Major also expires, and death like silence prevails. The most awe-inspiring cinematograph picture ever produced.

Cast
 Texas Jack as Frederick Russell Burnham, the American Chief of Scouts
 Peter Lobengula (the son of the real-life Matabele King) as King Lobengula
 Frank E. Fillis as Major Allan Wilson
 Cecil William Coleman as Captain Greenless
 Ndebele warriors—played by Zulu predominantly from the Colony of Natal.

See also
 Shangani Patrol (film) – The historical full-length feature film shot on location in Rhodesia and released in 1970.

References

Bibliography

External links
 

1899 films
1899 short films
1890s war films
1890s British films
British black-and-white films
British silent short films
British war drama films
Films set in 1893
Films set in Rhodesia
War films based on actual events
British films based on plays
Silent war drama films